Constituency NA-103 (Hafizabad-II) was a constituency for the National Assembly of Pakistan. It was one of the two constituencies for the district of Hafizabad before the 2018 delimitations. After the delimitations, the two constituencies were merged into one: NA-87.

Election 2002 

General elections were held on 10 Oct 2002. Chaudhry Liaqat Abbas Bhatti of PML-Q won by 67,626 votes.

Election 2008 

General elections were held on 18 Feb 2008. Chaudhry Liaqat Abbas Bhatti of PML-Q won by 56,791 votes.

Election 2013 

General elections were held on 11 May 2013. Mian Shahid Hussain Khan Bhatti of PML-N won and became the  member of National Assembly.

References

External links
 Election result's official website

NA-103
Abolished National Assembly Constituencies of Pakistan